De Soto is a village in Jackson County, Illinois, United States. The population was 1,590 at the 2010 census, down from 1,653 at the 2000 census. It is named for Hernando de Soto, the discoverer of the Mississippi River.

Geography
U.S. Route 51 passes through the center of the village, leading north  to Du Quoin and south  to Carbondale. Illinois Route 149 crosses US-51 in the village center, leading southwest  to Murphysboro, the Jackson county seat, and east  to Hurst.

The Big Muddy River, a tributary of the Mississippi River, flows to the east and south of the village limits.

History
De Soto was laid out in 1854 when the railroad was extended to that point. The village's name honors Hernando de Soto (c. 1496/1497–1542), a Spanish conquistador who explored the region in 1541-2. A post office has been in operation at De Soto since 1855.

De Soto was largely destroyed by the Great Tri-State Tornado of 1925. Sixty-nine people died in De Soto when approximately 30% of the town was destroyed, and of this total 33 were children at a local school that collapsed from the winds. The tornado affected Missouri, Illinois, and Indiana, killing 695 and injuring over 2,000.

Demographics

As of the census of 2000, there were 1,653 people, 673 households, and 444 families residing in the village. The racial makeup of the village was 97.58% White, 0.73% African American, 0.06% Native American, 0.42% Asian, 0.18% from other races, and 1.03% from two or more races. Hispanic or Latino of any race were 1.57% of the population.

There were 673 households, out of which 33.9% had children under the age of 18 living with them, 51.4% were married couples living together, 11.3% had a female householder with no husband present, and 33.9% were non-families. 27.3% of all households were made up of individuals, and 9.7% had someone living alone who was 65 years of age or older. The average household size was 2.45 and the average family size was 3.02.

In the village, the population was spread out, with 26.1% under the age of 18, 10.0% from 18 to 24, 33.3% from 25 to 44, 20.3% from 45 to 64, and 10.2% who were 65 years of age or older. The median age was 33 years. For every 100 females, there were 94.5 males. For every 100 females age 18 and over, there were 90.5 males.

The median income for a household in the village was $31,563, and the median income for a family was $34,929. Males had a median income of $30,400 versus $22,632 for females. The per capita income for the village was $15,526. About 10.1% of families and 14.3% of the population were below the poverty line, including 19.7% of those under age 18 and 11.1% of those age 65 or over.

References

External links
Village of DeSoto official website

Villages in Jackson County, Illinois
Villages in Illinois
Populated places established in 1854
1854 establishments in Illinois